Božica Mujović (born 7 January 1996 in Bijelo Polje, SR Yugoslavia) is a Montenegrin women's basketball player. She plays for Piešťanské Čajky at position Point guard. She is also a member of national team of Montenegro.

References

External links
Profile at eurobasket.com

1996 births
Living people
People from Bijelo Polje
Montenegrin women's basketball players
Point guards